The 2014 Uzbekistan PFL Cup is the second edition of a pre-season football competition held in Uzbekistan.

The competition featured four groups of 16 teams, with the top two advancing to the quarterfinal stages.

Group stage

Group A

Group B

Group C

Group D

Knockout stage

Quarter-finals

Semi-finals

Final

References

External links
 2014 PFL CUP on futbol24.com

Uzbekistan PFL Cup
PFL